In Etruscan mythology, Sethlans was the god of fire, the forge, metalworking, and by extension craftsmanship in general, the equivalent, though their names share no etymology, to Greek Hephaestus, Egyptian Ptah and the Roman Vulcan. Sethlans is one of the indigenous Etruscan gods. In Etruscan arts Sethlans may be identified by his tools, the hammer and tongs of the blacksmith, and by the pileus or conical cap he wears.

By what appears to be a curious omission, his name does not appear on the bronze liver of Piacenza.

Notes

See also 
 Etruscan civilization

Etruscan gods
Fire gods
Smithing gods
Etruscan religion